Chicontepec can refer to:

Chicontepec, a municipality in Veracruz, Mexico
Chicontepec de Tejeda, a town seat of municipality in Veracruz, Mexico
Chicontepec Formation, a petroleum-producing area of Mexico